Dmytro Hlushchenko, ukr. Дмитро Леонідович Глущенко (born 17 February 1981) is a Ukrainian sprinter who specializes in the 100 and 200 metres. His personal best time in the 200 metres is 20.75 seconds, achieved in May 2004 in Kyiv. In the 100 metres he has 10.25 seconds, achieved in July 2004 in Kyiv.

He finished fifth at the 2005 European Indoor Championships. He also competed at the 2005 World Championships, the 2006 European Championships, the 2008 World Indoor Championships and the 2008 Olympic Games without reaching the final.

References

1981 births
Living people
Ukrainian male sprinters
Athletes (track and field) at the 2008 Summer Olympics
Olympic athletes of Ukraine